Lebanese Armed Forces equipment still contains significant amounts of old weaponry, but it has embarked on some major improvements recently. The M113, which is commonly found with every regiment and brigade, is considered to be the major element of the ground forces. A collection of Western and Soviet made arms and equipment exists ranging from rifles to tanks. However, the Lebanese army is still trying to rearm and modernize itself through new aids and purchases from different countries such as the United States, Belgium, Russia, and The Netherlands.

Rearming and modernization
The LAF has been attempting to modernize and equip itself since 2005. Due to the budget limits, and instead of spawning an indigenous arms industry the LAF is relying on donations and friendly priced equipment.

The United States has been supplying the Lebanese Armed Forces with light to medium arms since 2005, in the form of a package of more than US$1.2 billion-worth of equipment that is still being executed. Among these supplies are HMMWV, M-35/A3, Mk 19 grenade launcher, M141 Bunker Defeat Munition, TOW 2, HELLFIRE 2, AT4, and Barrett M107 .50 Cal. sniper. The US has promised to supply Lebanon with M2A2 ODS and M109A5. In addition, the US supplied Lebanon with 12 RQ-11 Raven small hand-launched UAVs, 12 M-109A3 and 183 additional M198 Howitzers from 2008 to 2016 making the total to 219, and promised to deliver all water patrol boats and more utility, and attack helicopters.

On April 20, 2015, the Lebanese army took delivery of 48 MBDA Milan short-range anti-tank missiles as part of the $3 billion package donated by Saudi Arabia.

On February 19, 2016, The army chief expressed in an interview to Al-Akhbar newspaper the status of the Military aid to Lebanon and said: There are contributions from many countries, but they remain symbolic. The US still the largest armament supplier. 
Later on the same day the Saudi Arabia press agency quoted on a Saudi official, that Saudi Arabia halted the $3 billion program for military supplies to Lebanon.

Equipment

Pistols

Assault rifles

Sniper rifles

Machine guns

SMGs and Shotguns

Rocket/Grenade launchers

Vehicle mounted artillery

Anti-tank missiles

Anti-aircraft Weapons/Vehicles

Helmets

Optics

Night vision equipment

Unarmoured vehicles

Tanks

Armored personnel carrier

Armored fighting vehicle

Artillery

Other vehicle

Logistics and engineering equipment
 Minecat 230 Minesweeper
 Armtrac 100 Minesweeper
 Armtrac 75 Minesweeper
 Bozena Minesweeper
 Mini MineWolf
 Bulldozers (Armored and Non-armored)
 M52
 M813, M816 Wrecker, M818
 M543 Wrecker
 M49A2 Fuel tank truck
 Ural 4320 Crane
 M915
 Volvo NL10/NL12
 GMC TopKick
 Hino Trucks
 Jeep Wagoneer Signal truck
 Autoneige Snow Trac
 Thomas Built Buses
 Nissan Buses

Military simulation
 Janus, Engagement Skills Trainer 2000, 
 TOW anti-tank simulators, 
 Milan anti-tank simulators
 Huey Helicopter flight simulator

Recent supplies
Lebanese Army received 3 Huey 2 helicopters from the US on February-2021
Lebanese Army received VAB and Hot missiles and other equipments from France on May 30-2017
Lebanon received 12 M109 155mm self-propelled howitzer from Jordan in March 2015 and 400 Tow 2 by June 2015.
Lebanon received 72 M-198 Howitzers from the United States on February 8, 2015, along with M1044 (Up-Armored HMMWV) vehicles donated by the US, as part of the aid for fighting terrorism.
Lebanon received 120 Land Rover Defender 90 from the United Kingdom on December 10, 2013.
Lebanon received 71 HMMWVs ,M1038 Cargo/Troop Carrier, M1026 Armament Carrier w/ Basic Armor, M1044 Armament Carrier w/ Supplemental Armor, vehicles donated by the US on August 17, 2013
During August 2013 France has enhanced the operational capacities of the Lebanese army by providing military equipment. The gift, includes bulletproof vests, optical equipment and HOT missiles for Gazelle Helicopter
Lebanon received 31 M1151 (Up-Armored HMMWV) vehicles donated by the US on August 17, 2012
Lebanon received 24 M1151 (Up-Armored HMMWV) vehicles donated by the US on July 22, 2011
Lebanon received 106 vehicles donated by the UN in Lebanon on the Thirteenth of May 2011
 Lebanon received 30 M-198 Howitzers in January, 2010. This follows an earlier supply of 41 Howitzers in 2008, and 36 Howitzers operated by the LAF since the 80's.
 Lebanon received 16 AIFVs and 12 M-113 Ambulances early December 2009, these were purchased from Belgium.
 On May 22, Lebanon officially announced the delivery of the first 10 M60/A3, one M88, and several other items during a ceremony at Beirut International Airport.
 On March 23, 2009 the LAF took delivery of 40 HMMWVs, and 9 sport utility vehicles from the USA.
 On March 20, 2009, the LAF purchased 6 Kawasaki Brute Force 750 4×4i.
 On December 28, 2008 the USA delivered 72 HMMWVs were recently delivered, Twelve of these vehicles are ambulances.
 During 2008, the US supplied Lebanon with 200 M35A3 and 41 M198 Howitzers.
 As of March 2008, The Netherlands has donated 100 DAF trucks to the Lebanese Army.

See also
 List of former equipment of the Lebanese Armed Forces
 Weapons of the Lebanese Civil War
 Cedar rocket

References

Military equipment of Lebanon
Lebanon